Amato (1835 – 27 January 1841) was an English bred, English trained thoroughbred racehorse who won the Derby Stakes in 1838 on his only racecourse appearance. He was then injured and retired undefeated.

Breeding 

Amato was a brown bay colt, bred on Epsom Downs by Sir Gilbert Heathcote in 1835, and was by Velocipede out of Jane Shaw, by Woful out of Bella Dona (bred by the Duke of York in 1816), by Seymour. In his pedigree were notable thoroughbreds such as Perdita, Old Partner and Yellow Turk. At fifteen hands two inches Amato was on the small side and described as wiry.

Racing career

The Epsom trained Amato ridden by Jem Chapple won the 1838 Derby Stakes. According to contemporary accounts the start of Amato’s Derby was an unsatisfactory one. Before the flag was finally lowered there were three breaks away and when the signal to ‘go’ arrived two horses were left at the start whilst several others were slowly away.

Epsom's undulating cambers suited Heathcote’s horse who led from the mile post coming home to win by a length from Ion, with Grey Momus three lengths third. At 33/1 Amato’s victory was unexpected and much celebrated by the team who helped him to victory.

Local notoriety
Amato who was bred at The Durdans in Epsom by Heathcote and trained by local trainer Ralph Sherwood was a popular winner and today stands a public house, the ‘Amato Inn’  named in honour of the Derby winner. In a tradition going back 170 years the publican tips the winner of the Derby and displays the name for the race goers on the morning of The Derby

When Amato died in 1841  his body was buried in the grounds of Durdans, a stone that is still visible marking the spot.

He was painted by John Frederick Herring, Snr.

Stud career
Amato appears to have had little success as a stallion

Notes

References

1835 racehorse births
1841 racehorse deaths
Undefeated racehorses
Racehorses bred in the United Kingdom
Racehorses trained in the United Kingdom
Epsom Derby winners
Thoroughbred family 2-a